James Willie Harbot (16 August 1907 – 1992) was an English footballer who played in the Football League for Barrow, Charlton Athletic, Gillingham, Stoke City and Torquay United.

Career
Harbot was born in Bolton and joined the Royal Marines in the late 1920s. He played football with the Marines and joined Gillingham in 1930. Due to his army commitments he never was able to sustain a prolonged spell with one club spent a short time at Charlton Athletic, Barrow, Stoke City and Torquay United. In his only league match for Stoke City they beat West Bromwich Albion 10–3, their record league victory.

Career statistics
Source:

References

English footballers
Stoke City F.C. players
Torquay United F.C. players
Barrow A.F.C. players
Gillingham F.C. players
Charlton Athletic F.C. players
English Football League players
1907 births
1992 deaths
Association football fullbacks